Jamshid Ansari (born 1955) is an Iranian reformist politician, who served as Vice President of Iran for Administrative and Recruitment Affairs from 2016 to 2021.

He is former  head of Iran's Administrative and Recruitment Affairs Organization (ARAO).

References

Living people
People from Zanjan, Iran
Governors of Zanjan Province
Iranian reformists
Deputies of Zanjan and Tarom
Members of the 8th Islamic Consultative Assembly
Governors of West Azerbaijan Province
1955 births